"Normal" is a song released in 2015 by Alonzo and Jul.

Charts

References 

2015 singles
2015 songs
French-language songs